Thomas Bennett "Irish" Graham, Jr. (November 7, 1883 – April 12, 1940) was an American college football player.

Vanderbilt University

Graham was a prominent tackle for the Vanderbilt Commodores football teams. He stood 6 feet 1 inch and weighed 172 pounds.

1904
Graham was captain of the undefeated, Southern Intercollegiate Athletic Association champion 1904 team coached by Dan McGugin in his first year.  He was selected All-Southern by various publications. Graham graduated in 1905 with a B.S. in physics.

References

External links
 

1883 births
1940 deaths
Vanderbilt Commodores football players
American football tackles
American football guards
Players of American football from Nashville, Tennessee
All-Southern college football players